Susan Ruskin is a film producer.

Selected filmography
 The Woman in Red (1984)
 Haunted Honeymoon (1986)
 Anaconda (1997)

References

External links

American film producers
Living people
American women film producers
Year of birth missing (living people)
Place of birth missing (living people)
21st-century American women